Marianthus tenuis is a shrub of the pittosporum family, Pittosporaceae native to southwest Western Australia.

References

Apiales of Australia
Pittosporaceae
Flora of Western Australia
Plants described in 1863